Drita Albanian Folk Orchestra is an Albanian folk orchestra based in Los Angeles, California. It was established in 1982 by Ian Price and presents to the American audience traditional Albanian music. The orchestra uses instruments common in Albanian folk music and may include the Albanian clarinet, accordion, violin, tambourine, Lahutë, Çifteli, lute, pipes and flute etc.

The word, "drita," means "light" in the Albanian language, and does have that meaning in the group's name.

The orchestra has performed concerts in Los Angeles, San Diego, Berkeley, Chicago and New York City.

Group 
 Linda Levin
 Letitia Lucca
 Sue Rudnicki
 Rob Stokes
 Joe Carson
 Ian Price

References

Official site

Albanian-American history
American orchestras
European-American culture in Los Angeles
Musical groups established in 1982
1982 establishments in California